This article shows the 2018 season of South Korean football.

National team results

Senior team

Under-23 team

K League

K League 1

K League 2

Promotion-relegation playoffs
The promotion-relegation playoffs were held between the winners of the 2018 K League 2 playoffs and the 11th-placed club of the 2018 K League 1. The winners on aggregate score after both matches earned entry into the 2019 K League 1.

FC Seoul won 4–2 on aggregate and therefore both clubs remain in their respective leagues.

Korean FA Cup

Korea National League

WK League

Playoff and championship

AFC Champions League

See also
Football in South Korea

References

External links

 
Seasons in South Korean football